California's 48th congressional district is a congressional district in the U.S. state of California based in San Diego County in Southern California. It is currently represented by Republican Darrell Issa.

From 2013 to 2023, the district includes Costa Mesa,  Emerald Bay, Fountain Valley, Huntington Beach, Laguna Beach, Laguna Niguel, Newport Beach, Seal Beach,  Sunset Beach and parts of Garden Grove, Midway City, Aliso Viejo, Santa Ana and Westminster. It was very competitive and had recently been won by each of the two main parties. n the 2018 House elections, Democrat Harley Rouda became the district's representative, defeating incumbent Republican Dana Rohrabacher. Rouda was then defeated by Republican Michelle Steel in the 2020 elections.

From 2003 to 2013, the district included the cities of Aliso Viejo, Dana Point, Irvine, Laguna Beach, Laguna Hills, Laguna Niguel, Laguna Woods, Lake Forest (formerly known as El Toro), Tustin, parts of Irvine and parts of Newport Beach and San Juan Capistrano.

Demographics 
According to the APM Research Lab's Voter Profile Tools (featuring the U.S. Census Bureau's 2019 American Community Survey), the district contained about 514,000 potential voters (citizens, age 18+). Of these, 61% are White, 19% Asian, and 16% Latino. Immigrants make up 21% of the district's potential voters. Median income among households (with one or more potential voter) in the district is about $102,800. As for the educational attainment of potential voters in the district, 44% hold a bachelor's or higher degree.

Competitiveness 
, this district is one of nine that voted for Joe Biden in the 2020 presidential election while being held or won by a Republican.

In statewide races

Composition

As of the 2020 redistricting, California's 48th congressional district is located in Southern California. The district encompasses some of the East Country and all of the Mountain Empire areas of San Diego County, and part of south western Riverside County.

San Diego County is split between this district, the 49th district, the 50th district, the 51st district, and the 52nd district. The 48th and 49th are partitioned by Gavilan Mountain Rd, Sandia Creek Dr, De Luz Rd, Marine Corps Base Pendleton, Sleeping Indian Rd, Tumbleweed Ln, Del Valle Dr, Highland Oak St, Olive Hill Rd, Via Puerta del Sol, N River Rd, Highway 76, Old River Rd, and Little Gopher Canyon Rd.

The 48th and 50th are partitioned by Gopher Canyon Rd, Escondido Freeway, Mountain Meadow Rd, Hidden Meadows, Reidy Cyn, N Broadway, Cougar Pass Rd, Adagio Way, Calle Ricardo, Tatas Place, Rue Montreux, Jesmond Dene Rd, Ivy Dell Ln, N Centre City Parkway, Highway 15, Richland Rd, Vista Canal, Woodland Parkway, W El Norte Parkway, Bennett Ave, Elser Ln, Nordahl Rd, Calavo Dr, Deodar Rd, Highway 78, Barham Dr, 2315-2339 Meyers Ave, Hill Valley Dr, County Club Dr, Auto Park Way, Highway 56, N Centre City Parkway, W Valley Parkway, N Juniper St, Highway 78, N Hickory St, E Mission Ave, Martin Dr, E Lincoln Ave, N Ash St, E Grand Ave, Bear Valley Parkway, Old Guerjito Rd, San Pasqual Battlefield State Historic Park, San Pasqual Trails Openspace, San Dieguito River Park, Bandy Canyon Rd, Santa Maria Creek, Highland Valley Rd, West Ridge Trail, Palmer Dr/Summerfield Ln, Pomerado Rd, and Carmel Mountain Ranch Openspace.

The 48th and 51st are partitioned by Sabre Springs Openspace, Scripps Miramar Openspace, Beeler Canyon Rd, Sycamore Canyon Openspace, Weston Rd, Boulder Vis, Mast Blvd, West Hills Parkway, San Diego River, Highway 52, Simeon Dr, Mission Trails Openspace, Fanita Dr, Farmington Dr, Lund St, Nielsen St, Paseo de Los Castillos, Gillespie Air Field, Kenney St, San Vicente Freeway, Airport Dr, Wing Ave, W Bradley Ave, Vernon Way, Hart Dr, Greenfield Dr, E Bradley Ave, 830 Adele St-1789 N Mollison Ave, Peppervilla Dr/N Mollison Ave, Pepper Dr, Greta St/Cajon Greens Dr, N Mollison Ave/Buckey Dr, Denver Ln, Broadway Channel, N 2nd St, Flamingo Ave/Greenfield Dr, Dawnridge Ave/Cresthill Rd, Groveland Ter/Camillo Way, Sterling Dr, Kumeyaay Highway, E Madison Ave, Granite Hills Dr, E Lexington Ave, Dehesa Rd, Vista del Valle Blvd, Merritt Ter, E Washington Ave, Merritt Dr, Dewitt Ct, Emerald Heights Rd, Foote Path Way, Highway 8, Lemon Ave, Lake Helix Dr, La Cruz Dr, Carmichael Dr, Bancroft Dr, Campo Rd, and Sweetwater River.

The 48th and 52nd are partitioned by San Miguel Rd, Proctor Valley Rd, Camino Mojave/Jonel Way, Highway 125, Upper Otay Reservoir, Otay Lakes Rd, Otay Valley Regional Park, Alta Rd, and Otay Mountain Truck Trail. The 48th district takes in the cities of Santee, Poway, and northern Escondido, as well as the census-designated places Ramona, Rancho San Diego, Winter Gardens, Bostonia, Alpine, Campo, Hidden Meadows, Fallbrook, Valley Center, and Bonsall.

Riverside County is split between this district and the 41st district. They are partitioned by Ortega Highway, Tenaja Truck Trail, NF-7506, Tenaja, San Mateo Creek, Los Alamos Rd, Und 233, S Main Dv, Wildomar, Grand Ave, Rancho Mirlo Dr, Copper Canyon Park, 42174 Kimberly Way-35817 Darcy Pl, Escondido Expressway, Scott Rd, 33477 Little Reb Pl-33516 Pittman Ln, Keller Rd, Menifee Rd, Clinton Keith Rd, Max Gilliss Blvd, Highway 79, Borel Rd, Lake Skinner, Warren Rd, Summitville St, Indian Knoll Rd, E Benton Rd, Rancho California Rd, Overhill Rd, Green Meadow Rd, Crossover Rd, Exa-Ely Rd, Denise Rd, Wiley Rd, Powerline Rd, Wilson Valley Rd, Wilson Creek, Reed Valley Rd, Centennial St, Beaver Ave, and Lake Vista Dr.  The 48th district takes in the cities of Temecula and Murrieta.

Cities & CDP with 10,000 or more people
 Escondido - 151,038
 Murrieta - 110,949
 Temecula - 110,003
 Santee - 58,081
 Poway - 49,323
 Fallbrook - 32,359
 Winter Gardens - 22,785
 Rancho San Diego - 21,476
 Ramona - 21,493
 Bostonia - 16,882
 Alpine - 14,696
 Valley Center - 11,320

2,500-10,000 people
 Bonsall - 4,546
 Hidden Meadows - 3,675
 Borrego Springs - 3,073
 Campo - 2,955

List of members representing the district

Election results
District created January 3, 1993.

1992

1994

1996

1998

2000

2002

2004

2005

2006

2008

2010

2012

2014

2016

2018

2020

2022

Historical district boundaries
From 2003 through 2013, the district consisted of many of Orange's south-central suburbs, including Irvine, and Newport Beach. Due to redistricting after the 2010 United States census, the district has moved south east along the coast of Orange and then included Laguna Beach and Huntington Beach.

After the 2020 United States census, the district was moved to the inland portion of San Diego County, including Fallbrook, Murrieta, Temecula, Pauma Valley, Warner Springs, Borrego Springs, Santa Ysabel, Julian, Ramona, Poway, Santee, Lakeside, Descanso, Jamul, Dulzura, Alpine, Pine Valley, Campo, Jacumba Hot Springs, all of San Diego's Mountain Empire, San Diego's Indian reservations and portions of northern Escondido, and eastern La Mesa.

See also
List of United States congressional districts
California 48th congressional district special election, 2005

References

External links
GovTrack.us: California's 48th congressional district
RAND California Election Returns: District Definitions
California Voter Foundation map - CD48

48
Government in Orange County, California
Aliso Viejo, California
Costa Mesa, California
Fountain Valley, California
Garden Grove, California
Huntington Beach, California
Laguna Beach, California
Laguna Niguel, California
Newport Beach, California
Santa Ana, California
Seal Beach, California
Westminster, California
Constituencies established in 1993
1993 establishments in California